Stuart L. Schreiber (born  6 February 1956) is a scientist at Harvard University and co-Founder of the Broad Institute. He has been active in chemical biology, especially the use of small molecules as probes of biology and medicine. Small molecules are the molecules of life most associated with dynamic information flow; these work in concert with the macromolecules (DNA, RNA, proteins) that are the basis for inherited information flow.

Education and training

Schreiber obtained a Bachelor of Science degree in chemistry from the University of Virginia in 1977, after which he entered Harvard University as a graduate student in Chemistry. He joined the research group of Robert B. Woodward and after Woodward's death continued his studies under the supervision of Yoshito Kishi. In 1980, he joined the faculty of Yale University as an assistant professor in Chemistry, and in 1988 he moved to Harvard University as the Morris Loeb Professor.

Work in 1980s and 1990s
Schreiber started his research work in organic synthesis, focusing on concepts such as the use of [2 + 2] photocycloadditions to establish stereochemistry in complex molecules, the fragmentation of hydroperoxides to produce macrolides, ancillary stereocontrol, group selectivity and two-directional synthesis. Notable accomplishments include the total syntheses of complex natural products such as talaromycin B, asteltoxin, avenaciolide, gloeosporone, hikizimicin, mycoticin A, epoxydictymene and the immunosuppressant FK-506.

Following his work on the FK506-binding protein FKBP12 in 1988, Schreiber reported that the small molecules FK506 and cyclosporin inhibit the activity of the phosphatase calcineurin by forming the ternary complexes FKBP12-FK506-calcineurin and cyclophilin-ciclosporin-calcineurin. This work, together with work by Gerald Crabtree at Stanford University concerning the NFAT proteins, led to the elucidation of the calcium-calcineurin-NFAT signaling pathway. The Ras-Raf-MAPK pathway was not elucidated for another year.

In 1993, Schreiber and Crabtree developed "small-molecule dimerizers", which provide small-molecule activation over numerous signaling molecules and pathways (e.g., the Fas, insulin, TGFβ and T-cell receptors) through proximity effects. Schreiber and Crabtree demonstrated that small molecules could activate a signaling pathway in an animal with temporal and spatial control. Dimerizer kits have been distributed freely resulting in many peer-reviewed publications.  Its promise in gene therapy has been highlighted by the ability of a small molecule to activate a small-molecule regulated EPO receptor and to induce erythropoiesis (Ariad Pharmaceuticals, Inc.), and more recently in human clinical trials for treatment of graft-vs-host disease.

In 1994, Schreiber and co-workers investigated (independently with David Sabitini) the master regulator of nutrient sensing, mTOR. They found that the small molecule rapamycin simultaneously binds FKBP12 and mTOR (originally named FKBP12-rapamycin binding protein, FRAP). Using diversity-oriented synthesis and small-molecule screening, Schreiber illuminate the nutrient-response signaling network involving TOR proteins in yeast and mTOR in mammalian cells.  Small molecules such as uretupamine and rapamycin were shown to be particularly effective in revealing the ability of proteins such as mTOR, Tor1p, Tor2p, and Ure2p to receive multiple inputs and to process them appropriately towards multiple outputs (in analogy to multi-channel processors).  Several pharmaceutical companies are now targeting the nutrient-signaling network for the treatment of several forms of cancer, including solid tumors.

In 1995, Schreiber and co-workers found that the small molecule lactacystin binds and inhibits specific catalytic subunits of the proteasome, a protein complex responsible for the bulk of proteolysis in the cell, as well as proteolytic activation of certain protein substrates. As a non-peptidic proteasome inhibitor lactacysin has proven useful in the study of proteasome function. Lactacystin modifies the amino-terminal threonine of specific proteasome subunits. This work helped to establish the proteasome as a mechanistically novel class of protease: an amino-terminal threonine protease.  The work led to the use of bortezomib to treat multiple myeloma.

In 1996, Schreiber and co-workers used the small molecules trapoxin and depudecin to investigate the histone deacetylases (HDACs). Prior to Schreiber's work in this area, the HDAC proteins had not been isolated. Coincident with the HDAC work, David Allis and colleagues reported work on the histone acetyltransferases (HATs). These two contributions catalyzed much research in this area, eventually leading to the characterization of numerous histone-modifying enzymes, their resulting histone “marks”, and numerous proteins that bind to these marks.  By taking a global approach to understanding chromatin function, Schreiber proposed a “signaling network model” of chromatin and compared it to an alternative view, the “histone code hypothesis” presented by Strahl and Allis. These studies shined a bright light on chromatin as a key gene expression regulatory element rather than simply a structural element used for DNA compaction.

Chemical biology
Schreiber applied small molecules to biology through the development of diversity-oriented synthesis (DOS), chemical genetics, and ChemBank. Schreiber has shown that DOS can produce small molecules distributed in defined ways in chemical space by virtue of their different skeletons and stereochemistry, and that it can provide chemical handles on products anticipating the need for follow-up chemistry using, for example, combinatorial synthesis and the so-called Build/Couple/Pair strategy of modular chemical synthesis. DOS pathways and new techniques for small-molecule screening  provided many new, potentially disruptive insights into biology.  Small-molecule probes of histone and tubulin deacetylases, transcription factors, cytoplasmic anchoring proteins, developmental signaling proteins (e.g., histacin, tubacin, haptamide, uretupamine,  concentramide, and calmodulophilin), among many others, have been uncovered in the Schreiber lab using diversity-oriented synthesis and chemical genetics. Multidimensional screening was introduced in 2002 and has provided insights into tumorigenesis, cell polarity, and chemical space, among others.

Schreiber also contributed to more conventional small molecule discovery projects. He collaborated with Tim Mitchison to discover monastrol – the first small-molecule inhibitor of mitosis that does not target tubulin. Monastrol was shown to inhibit kinesin-5, a motor protein and was used to gain new insights into the functions of kinesin-5. This work led pharmaceutical company Merck, among others, to pursue anti-cancer drugs that target human kinesin-5. 

Schreiber has used small molecules to study three specific areas of biology, and then through the more general application of small molecules in biomedical research. Academic screening centers have been created that emulate the Harvard Institute of Chemistry and Cell Biology and the Broad Institute; in the U.S., there has been a nationwide effort to expand this capability via the government-sponsored NIH Road Map. Chemistry departments have changed their names to include the term chemical biology and new journals have been introduced (Cell Chemical Biology, ChemBioChem, Nature Chemical Biology, ACS Chemical Biology]) to cover the field.  Schreiber has been involved in the founding of numerous biopharmaceutical companies whose research relies on chemical biology: Vertex Pharmaceuticals, Inc. (VRTX), Ariad Pharmaceuticals, Inc. (ARIA), Infinity Pharmaceuticals, Inc (INFI), Forma Therapeutics, H3 Biomedicine, Jnana Therapeutics, and Kojin Therapeutics.  These companies have produced new therapeutics in several disease areas, including cystic fibrosis and cancer.

Other research 
Schreiber has collaborated with the pharmaceutical company Eisai. Other work focused on targeting the cancer therapy-resistant states.

Selected awards

 ACS Award in Pure Chemistry (1989)  "For pioneering investigations into the synthesis and mode of action of natural products."
 Ciba-Geigy Drew Award for Biomedical Research: Molecular Basis for Immune Regulation (1992).  "For the discovery of immunophilins and for his role in elucidating the calcium-calcineurin-NFAT signaling pathway."
 Leo Hendrik Baekeland Award, North Jersey Section of ACS (1993).  "For outstanding achievement in creative chemistry."
 Eli Lilly Award in Biological Chemistry, ACS (1993).  "For fundamental research in biological chemistry."
 American Chemical Society Award in Synthetic Organic Chemistry (1994).  "For creative accomplishments at the interface of organic synthesis, molecular biology, and cell biology as exemplified by landmark discoveries in the immunophilin area."
 George Ledlie Prize (Harvard University)  (1994).  "For his research which has profoundly influenced our understanding of the chemistry of cell biology and illuminated fundamental processes of molecular recognition and signaling in cell biology."
 Paul Karrer Gold Medal (1994) at the University of Zurich.
 Harrison Howe Award (1995).  "In recognition of accomplishments in the synthesis of complex organic molecules, progress in understanding the immunosuppressant action of FK506, and innovation in molecular recognition and its role in intracellular signaling."
 Warren Triennial Award (shared with Leland Hartwell)  (1995).  "For creating a new field in organic chemistry, what Phil Sharp has coined 'chemical cell biology.'  In these studies, small molecules have been synthesized and used to understand and control signal transduction pathways.  Schreiber has made it possible to generalize the use of small molecules to study protein function in analogy to the use of mutations in genetics.  This approach has illuminated fundamental processes in cell biology and has great promise in medicine."
 Tetrahedron Prize for Creativity in Organic Chemistry (1997).  "For his fundamental contributions to chemical synthesis with biological and medicinal implications."
 ACS Award for Bioorganic Chemistry (2000).  "For his development of the field of chemical genetics, where small molecules are used to dissect the circuitry of cells using genetic-like screens."
 William H. Nichols Medal (2001).  "For contributions toward understanding the chemistry of intracellular signaling."
 Chiron Corporation Biotechnology Research Award, American Academy of Microbiology (2001).  "For the development of systematic approaches to biology using small molecules."
 Society for Biomolecular Screening Achievement Award (2004).  "In recognition of the advances made in the field of chemical biology through the development and application of tools that enable the systematic use of small molecules to elucidate fundamental biological pathways."
 American Association of Cancer Institutes (2004).  "For his development of the field of chemical biology, which has resulted in a new approach to the treatment of cancer."
 Arthur C. Cope Award (2014)
 Nagoya Gold Medal (2015)
 Wolf Prize (2016). "For pioneering chemical insights into the logic of signal transduction and gene regulation that led to important, new therapeutics and for advancing chemical biology and medicine through the discovery of small-molecule probes."
 National Academy of Medicine, elected 2018

Notes and references

Further reading

External links
 Broad Institute of Harvard and MIT, Chemical Biology Program
 Schreiber lab, Harvard University
 HHMI Genomics & Chemical Genetics, Video Lecture
 ChemBank

1956 births
Living people
21st-century American chemists
University of Virginia alumni
Harvard University alumni
Yale University faculty
Massachusetts Institute of Technology faculty
Harvard University faculty
Members of the United States National Academy of Sciences
Howard Hughes Medical Investigators
Place of birth missing (living people)
Wolf Prize in Chemistry laureates
Members of the National Academy of Medicine